The former First Church of Christ, Scientist is an historic Christian Science church edifice located at 189 Keith Road on the eastern end of Victoria Park in North Vancouver, British Columbia, Canada.

It was designed in the Classical Revival style by the noted British Columbia architectural firm of Honeyman and Curtis. Built in 1925, it is a  single-storey wooden building with basement. The city of North Vancouver has declared that the building is "valued for its architecture and classically-inspired details" and "distinguished by a  formal central entrance and consistent, refined detailing".  Saying that its: "Columns, symmetry and fenestration all contribute to its strong sense of proportion and formality", the city on January 1, 1995, designated it a primary local heritage site.

On January 4, 2008, First Church of Christ, Scientist sold its building to North Shore Bethel Christian Mennonite Brethren Church.

References

Former Christian Science churches, societies and buildings in Canada
North Vancouver (city)
Heritage sites in British Columbia
Churches completed in 1925
Neoclassical church buildings in Canada
20th-century churches in Canada